Anit Ghosh (born 12 February 1977) is a former international Indian footballer. He played as defender for several NFL and I-League clubs during a 20 year career.

Career
Anit Ghosh was one of the best defenders of the country.

From 1992 to 1995 he played for Tata Football Academy, in 1996 for Mohun Bagan Club, in 1997 for Churchill Brothers.  

From 1994 to 1999 he played Asian Games. In 1998 Bangkok Asian Games and in 1996 pre-World Cup. In the same year, he played the Asia Cup and in 1999 he played in the pre-Olympics. 

From 1998 to 2004 he played for East Bengal Club. He captained East Bengal F.C. in the 2002-03 season. Under his captaincy, East Bengal FC won 5 tournaments. The club achieved five trophies, including National League. 

From 2004 to 2005 he played for the Mohammedan club but in middle, he joined Goa Fansa Club. Again from 2006 to 2007, he played for Mohun Bagan Club and in 2008 for Mohammedan Club. In the year 2009, he played for the Small (CFL) club till the year 2012. He played for the National team for 10 years.  

He holds three National League Champion titles from the East Bengal club.

Honours

East Bengal 
ASEAN Club Championship (1): 2003
National Football League (3): 2000-01, 2002-03, 2003-04
Calcutta Football League (6): 1998, 1999, 2000, 2002, 2003
IFA Shield (3): 2000, 2001, 2002
Durand Cup (2): 2002
All Airlines Gold Cup (1): 2001
Independence Day Cup (1): 2002-03
McDowell Cup (1): 2000

References

External links
 

1977 births
Living people
Indian footballers
Mohun Bagan AC players
East Bengal Club players
Association football defenders
Footballers from West Bengal
I-League players
Footballers at the 1998 Asian Games
Asian Games competitors for India